Agricultural Cooperative Bank of Iraq is an Iraqi bank based in Baghdad, Iraq. The bank's main area of activity is to give loans for agricultural projects represented by farmers.

It is one of four special purpose banks established after the Second Gulf War.

See also
Iraqi dinar

References
 http://www.cbi.iq/index.php?pid=IraqFinancialInst&lang=en

Official website
 https://web.archive.org/web/20100511171248/http://www.agriculturalbank.gov.iq/

Companies based in Baghdad
Agriculture in Iraq
Banks of Iraq
Banks established in 1935
1935 establishments in Iraq